Francis R. Byers (1920-1993) was a member of the Wisconsin State Assembly.

Biography
Byers was born on March 30, 1920, in Marion, Wisconsin. He graduated from the University of Wisconsin–Madison, and died on March 11, 1993, in Marion. During World War II, he served in the United States Navy. He was awarded the Purple Heart.

Political career
Byers was a member of the Assembly from 1969 to 1989 sessions. He was a Republican. Byers was succeeded by William Lorge.

References

External links
The Political Graveyard
RootsWeb

People from Marion, Wisconsin
Republican Party members of the Wisconsin State Assembly
Military personnel from Wisconsin
United States Navy personnel of World War II
University of Wisconsin–Madison alumni
1920 births
1993 deaths
Burials in Wisconsin
20th-century American politicians